Gmina Babiak is a rural gmina (administrative district) in Koło County, Greater Poland Voivodeship, in west-central Poland.

Villages
Gmina Babiak contains the villages and settlements of Babiak, Bogusławice, Bogusławice-Nowiny, Brdów, Brzezie, Bugaj, Dębno Królewskie, Dębno Poproboszczowskie, Góraj, Gryglaki, Janowice, Józefowo, Kiejsze, Korzecznik-Podlesie, Korzecznik-Szatanowo, Krukowo, Łaziska, Lichenek, Lipie Góry, Lubotyń, Maliniec, Mchowo, Nowiny Brdowskie, Olszak, Osówie, Ozorzyn, Podkiejsze, Polonisz, Psary, Radoszewice, Stare Morzyce, Stefanowo, Stypin, Suchy Las, Wiecinin, Zakrzewo, Żurawieniec, and Zwierzchociny.

Neighbouring gminas
Gmina Babiak is bordered by the gminas of Grzegorzew, Izbica Kujawska, Kłodawa, Koło, Osiek Mały, Przedecz, Sompolno, Topólka, and Wierzbinek.

References
Polish official population figures 2006

Babiak
Koło County